Qaleh-ye Meydan (also Romanized as Qal‘eh-ye Meydān) is a village in Hati Rural District, Hati District, Lali County, Khuzestan Province, Iran. At the 2006 census, its population was 421, in 80 families.

References 

Populated places in Lali County